Coleophora hospitiella is a moth of the family Coleophoridae. It is found on the Canary Islands (Tenerife, La Gomera, Fuerteventura), North Africa (including Libya and Tunisia), Saudi Arabia, Iran, Afghanistan and Uzbekistan.

The larvae feed on Medicago laciniata. They create a rather flat lobe case of 7–9 mm long, composed of fairly large leaf fragments. Later, the larvae start feeding on the ripening seeds. Larvae can be found from January to May. Dependent on rain, larvae may wait one to several years before pupation takes place.

References

hospitiella
Moths described in 1915
Moths of Africa
Moths of Asia